Horton is a pair of small settlements, West Horton and East Horton, divided by a stream - the Horton Burn - in Northumberland, England  north east of Wooler and  west of Belford.

It is first attested as Horton' (Turbervill) ('Horton held by the Turbervill family') in 1242. The place-name Horton is a common one in England. It derives from Old English horu 'dirt' and tūn 'settlement, farm, estate', presumably meaning 'farm on muddy soil'.

Landmarks

The causeway was a Roman road which started at the Portgate on Hadrian's Wall, north of Corbridge, and extended  northwards across Northumberland to the mouth of the River Tweed at Berwick-upon-Tweed.

Two miles to the north of the village is Hetton Hall, which comprises a 15th-century pele tower with 18th and 19th century additions.

A little over a mile to the south-west, Weetwood Hall is another medieval tower house, altered and extended in the 18th and 19th centuries.

References

External links

Villages in Northumberland